Boris Miholjević (born 24 July 1938) is a Croatian theater, television and film actor. He appeared in more than seventy films since 1963.

Selected filmography

References

External links 

1938 births
Living people
People from Petrinja
Croatian male film actors